Tom Helm may refer to:

Tom Helm (cricketer) (born 1994), English cricketer
Tom Helm (politician) (born 1941), Australian politician
Tom Helm (rugby) (c.1886–unknown), Scottish rugby union and rugby league footballer